Higher Education Review is a triannual peer-reviewed academic journal established in 1968 that covers research on post-secondary education.

Mission
Its mission is as an "academic journal concerned with policy and practice, with contributions soundly based in research or scholarship, but with implications for reform or change". The editor-in-chief is Rob Cuthbert (University of the West of England), taking over from John Pratt who retired in 2012.

History
Higher Education Review was established in 1968 by Cornmarket Press with Tyrrell Burgess as founding editor. In 1970, Burgess became publisher and led its publication until his death in 2009. The journal continues to be published by Tyrrell Burgess Associates.

Higher Education Review is indexed by the Education Resources Information Center (ERIC). It was recently ranked 11th of 67 higher education journals for both quality and esteem in a study by the University of Newcastle, Australia.

References

External links

Online Class Help

Education journals
Triannual journals
English-language journals
Publications established in 1968